Calamotropha latellus is a moth in the family Crambidae. It was described by Snellen in 1890. It is found in India (Darjeeling).

References

Crambinae
Moths described in 1890
Taxa named by Samuel Constantinus Snellen van Vollenhoven